Jim Chester is an American college baseball coach and former player. He is the head baseball coach for Gardner–Webb University. Chester played college baseball at Thiel College for coach Joe Schaly from 2000 to 2003.

Playing career
Chester played college baseball at Thiel College.

Coaching career
On August 4, 2014, Chester was named the head baseball coach for Lock Haven University. On November 8, 2017, Chester was named the head baseball coach for Barton College.

On June 14, 2019, Chest was named the head coach at Gardner–Webb University.

Head coaching record

See also
 List of current NCAA Division I baseball coaches

References

External links
Gardner–Webb Runnin' Bulldogs bio

Living people
Thiel Tomcats baseball players
Seton Hill Griffins baseball coaches
Mercyhurst North East Saints baseball coaches
Penn State Greater Allegheny Nittany Lions baseball coaches
Lock Haven Bald Eagles baseball coaches
Barton Bulldogs baseball coaches
Gardner–Webb Runnin' Bulldogs baseball coaches
Year of birth missing (living people)